Iowa Highway 10 (Iowa 10) is a state highway that runs  across the state of Iowa. It begins where South Dakota Highway 46 crosses the Big Sioux River into Iowa north of Hawarden. It ends east of Havelock at an intersection with Iowa Highway 4.

Description

Iowa Highway 10 begins by going south towards Hawarden. At Hawarden, it intersects Iowa Highway 12, then turns east. Before entering Orange City, Iowa 10 intersects U.S. Highway 75. After Orange City, it enters Alton, meeting Iowa Highway 60. It continues east through Granville and meets Iowa Highway 143 before entering Paullina. They separate and Iowa 10 then enters Sutherland. Iowa 10 turns slightly southeast to go through Peterson, then continues east until intersecting U.S. Highway 71. Iowa 10 then goes south with U.S. 71, passing through Sioux Rapids before turning east again. Iowa 10 then passes through Marathon, Laurens and Havelock before ending at Iowa Highway 4 shortly after Havelock.

History
Iowa Highway 10 was designated as a state highway in 1920. It crossed Iowa from west to east, going from Hawarden to McGregor. It was shortened to Strawberry Point in 1926, then extended to Luxemburg in 1930 and Dubuque in 1939. In 1945, the highway was shortened to Pocahontas and in 1969, was shortened to its current eastern terminus.

Major intersections

Related route

In Alton, Iowa 450 is a  route which provides a direct connection between Iowa 10 and Iowa 60. It was designated when Iowa 60 moved onto a four-lane bypass of Alton. Prior to the construction of the bypass, the two routes which Iowa 450 connect intersected in Alton.

References

010